The 1934 FIFA World Cup was the first World Cup for which teams had to qualify, after the finalists in the inaugural 1930 World Cup had participated by invitation from FIFA. With 32 teams having entered the 1934 competition, FIFA organized qualification rounds to select 16 teams for the finals. Even Italy, the host of the World Cup, had to earn its spot, the only time this has been the case. The previous champion Uruguay refused to defend its title because many European nations had declined to take part in the 1930 World Cup, held in Uruguay.

Of the 32 teams which entered,

 Chile, Peru and Turkey all withdrew before qualifying began.
 Brazil and Argentina qualified without playing any matches owing to the withdrawal of their opponents.
 The other 27 teams played at least one qualifying match.
 Greece, Bulgaria and Poland withdrew partway through the planned schedule of qualifying matches. 

The first match, between Sweden and Estonia, took place in Stockholm on 11 June 1933, with Swedish player Knut Kroon scoring the first goal. The last match was played in Rome only three days before the start of the tournament, as late entrant United States beat Mexico to become the final team to qualify.

Format

The 32 teams were divided into 12 groups, based on geographical considerations, as follows:
Groups 1 to 8 – Europe: 12 places, contested by 21 teams.
Groups 9, 10 and 11 – Americas: 3 places, contested by 8 teams.
Group 12 – Africa and Asia: 1 place, contested by 3 teams (including Turkey).

The 12 groups had different rules, as follows:
Group 1 had 3 teams. The teams played against each other once. The group winner would qualify.
Groups 2, 3 and 5 had 2 teams each. The teams played against each other on a home-and-away basis. The group winners would qualify.
Group 4 had 3 teams. The teams played against each other twice. The group winner and runner-up would qualify.
Groups 6, 7 and 8 had 3 teams each. The teams played against each other once. The group winners and runners-up would qualify.
Groups 9 and 10 had 2 teams each. The group winners would qualify.
Group 11 had 4 teams. There would be three rounds of play:
 First Round: Haiti played against Cuba thrice. The winner would advance to the Second Round.
 Second Round: Mexico played against the winner of the First Round thrice at home. The winner would advance to the Final Round.
 Final Round: USA played against the winner of the Second Round in a single match on neutral ground. The winner would qualify.
Group 12 had 3 teams. After Turkey withdrew before the matches began, the remaining 2 teams played against each other on a home-and-away basis. The group winner would qualify.

Key:
Teams highlighted in green qualified for the finals.
Teams highlighted in orange qualified for the next phase of their group.

Groups

Group 1

 

Estonia v Lithuania was not played since neither team could qualify with a win.

Sweden qualified.

Group 2

 

11–1 on aggregate; Spain qualified.

Group 3

Italy qualified, as Greece declined to play the second match.

Group 4

 

 

Bulgaria withdrew, and the remaining matches were not played since Hungary and Austria were already assured of the top two spots.

Hungary and Austria qualified.

Group 5

Czechoslovakia qualified.

Group 6

 

 

Romania and Switzerland qualified.

Group 7

 

 

Netherlands and Belgium qualified (Belgium finished above the Irish Free State on goal average).

Group 8

 

Germany v France was not played since both teams were already assured of the top two spots.

Germany and France qualified.

Group 9

Peru withdrew, so Brazil qualified automatically.

Group 10

Chile withdrew, so Argentina qualified automatically.

Group 11

First round

 

 

10–2 on aggregate; Cuba advanced to the Second Round.

Second round

 

 

12–3 on aggregate; Mexico advanced to the Final Round.

Final round

The match to decide whether USA or Mexico would qualify was played in Italy only three days before the start of the final tournament, as the USA team submitted their entry too late. Thus, the match was played on Italian ground, so that the winner would effectively stay for the tournament.

United States qualified.

Group 12
The Palestine football team consisted exclusively of Jewish and British players. 

FIFA states, in reference to the 1930s Palestine Mandate team, that the 'Palestine team' that  participated in previous competitions in the 1930s was actually the forerunner of today's Israel team, and as such bears no relation to the modern-day Palestine national team. However, the region currently known as Palestine is considered one of the first Asian teams to compete in the FIFA World Cup qualifiers.

 

11–2 on aggregate; Egypt qualified.

Qualified teams
Only six of the teams qualifying for the final competition – Argentina, Belgium, Brazil, France, Romania, and the USA – had already attended the World Cup in 1930.

Goalscorers

7 goals
 Mario López
 Dionisio Mejía
 Isidro Lángara

5 goals

 Mahmoud Mokhtar El Tetsh
 Paddy Moore

4 goals
 Jean Nicolas
 Josef Rasselnberg
 Beb Bakhuys
 Aldo Donelli

3 goals

 Johann Horvath
 Mohamed Latif
 Karl Hohmann
 Gábor P. Szabó
 Manuel Alonso
 Kick Smit

2 goals

 François Vanden Eynde
 Héctor Socorro
 Mostafa Taha
 Robert St. Fort
 József Solti
 Giuseppe Meazza
 Leen Vente
 Ștefan Dobay
 Luis Regueiro
 Bertil Ericsson
 Knut Hansson
 Vladimir Kragić

1 goal

 Matthias Sindelar
 Rudolf Viertl
 Karl Zischek
 Jean Capelle
 Stan Vanden Eynde
 Laurent Grimmonprez
 Bernard Voorhoof
 Dimitar Baikushev
 Mihail Lozanov
 Vladimir Todorov
 Enrique Ferrer
 Ángel Martínez
 Francisco Socorro
 Salvador Soto
 František Pelcner
 Josef Silný
 Abdulrahman Fawzi
 Leonhard Kass
 Richard Kuremaa
 Alfred Aston
 Ernest Libérati
 Ernst Albrecht
 Willi Wigold
 Imre Markos
 György Sárosi
 Géza Toldi
 Johnny Squires
 Giovanni Ferrari
 Anfilogino Guarisi
 Ernest Mengel
 Théophile Speicher
 Avraham Nudelmann
 Yohanan Sukenik
 Fernando Marcos
 Felipe Rosas
 José Ruvalcaba
 Jorge Sota
 Henryk Martyna
 Vítor Silva
 Sándor Schwartz
 Grațian Sepi
 Eduardo González
 Martí Ventolrà
 Sven Andersson
 Lennart Bunke
 Torsten Bunke
 Knut Kroon
 Alessandro Frigerio
 Erwin Hochsträsser
 Ernst Hufschmid
 Willy Jäggi
 Blagoje Marjanović

Footnotes

References

External links
1934 FIFA World Cup qualification at FIFA.com
1934 FIFA World Cup qualification at RSSSF.com

Football World Cup
Qualification
FIFA World Cup qualification